Wormwood: Gentleman Corpse is the second solo comic book series by creator Ben Templesmith.  Unlike the bleak post-apocalyptic world of Templesmith's previous work, Singularity 7, Wormwood is a lighter series which combines humor and horror. It was first published as short episodic serials within LOFI magazine from 2004 until it ceased publication. IDW Publishing then collected those serials in a single #0 issue called The Taster in 2006 before releasing new stories in the form of several miniseries, the most recent being Calamari Rising. The hardcover edition of the initial series has gone on to be a New York Times bestseller.

Plot
The stories of Wormwood: Gentleman Corpse revolve around the adventures of Wormwood, a trans-dimensional demigod worm, who frequently saves the world from supernatural threats. Wormwood can control a dead body by burrowing in his host's head; his preferred vessel is a well-dressed man, hence the subtitle. Although he repeatedly has made claims of godhood, he usually saves the world through cunning or otherwise underhanded means rather than force, such as paying off the Four Horsemen of the Apocalypse.

References

External links
Templesmith.com
IDW Publishing
Comicsbullettin.com interview with Templesmith on Wormwood: Gentleman Corpse
Skullring.org interview on Wormwood
IGN.com on Templesmith and Wormwood
Wormwood on Le Bd-Vore : French site

IDW Publishing titles
Comics by Ben Templesmith
Humor comics
Horror comics